The 2013 Brussels Open was a women's tennis tournament played on outdoor clay courts. It was the third and last edition of the Brussels Open, and was part of the Premier-level tournaments of the 2013 WTA Tour. The event took place at the Royal Primerose Tennis Club in Brussels, Belgium, from May 18 through May 25, 2013.

Singles main draw entrants

Seeds 

 1 Rankings are as of May 13, 2013.

Other entrants 
The following players received wildcards into the singles main draw:
  Elena Baltacha
  Alison Van Uytvanck
  Caroline Wozniacki

The following players received entry from the qualifying draw:
  Mallory Burdette
  Melanie Oudin
  Yulia Putintseva
  Zhang Shuai

The following player received entry as a lucky loser:
  Coco Vandeweghe

Withdrawals 
Before the tournament
  Irina-Camelia Begu
  Simona Halep (calf injury)
  Kristina Mladenovic
  Ayumi Morita
  Agnieszka Radwańska

Retirements 
  Julia Görges

Doubles main draw entrants

Seeds 

 1 Rankings are as of May 13, 2013.

Other entrants 
The following pair received a wildcard into the doubles main draw:
  Kirsten Flipkens /  Magdaléna Rybáriková

Champions

Singles 

  Kaia Kanepi def.  Peng Shuai, 6–2, 7–5

Doubles 

 Anna-Lena Grönefeld /  Květa Peschke def.  Gabriela Dabrowski /  Shahar Pe'er, 6–0, 6–3

References

External links 
 

Brussels Open
Brussels Open
2010s in Brussels
May 2013 sports events in Europe